Gordon Rees Scully Mansukhani, LLP, commonly referred to as Gordon & Rees, is an AmLaw 100 law firm based in the United States, with more than 1,000 lawyers practicing in all 50 states.

History
The firm was founded as Gordon & Rees in San Francisco in 1974 by Stuart Gordon and Donald Rees. In the ensuing 45+ years, the firm has grown to a national firm with attorneys licensed and practicing in every state in the country. In 2014, the name of the firm was expanded to Gordon Rees Scully Mansukhani, adding Miles Scully and Roger Mansukhani as named partners.

In 2019, Gordon & Rees became the first and only law firm in the nation’s history to open offices in all 50 states.  As such, the firm markets itself as combining the resources of a full-service national firm with the local knowledge of a regional firm. Featuring more than 1,000 lawyers nationwide, the firm provides comprehensive litigation and business transactions services to public and private companies ranging from start-ups to Fortune 500 corporations.

Recognition 
Law360 recognized Gordon & Rees among the 25 largest law firms in the nation as listed in the Law360 400. The American Lawyer has recognized Gordon & Rees among the fastest growing law firms in the country.  The firm is currently ranked as #96 in the AmLaw 200 rankings.

U.S. News has given the firm Tier 1 rankings across 15 different practice areas.  Practice areas include appellate, banking & finance, class action, commercial litigation, construction, corporate law, employment defense, environmental, franchise, health care, insurance, legal and medical malpractice defense, intellectual property, maritime, mass tort, product liability, and tax. In addition, 104 lawyers have been named to the U.S. News Best Lawyers in America© list, 2021, with six recognized as "Lawyers of the Year" in 2021.  Further, 37 lawyers were named to the inaugural edition of the Best Lawyers: Ones to Watch, 2021. 

Chambers USA has recognized the firm and several partners in the area of Insurance for numerous years.

Practices
Gordon & Rees is a full service business firm with more than 50 practice and industry areas of focus. The firm's practice areas include Advertising and E-Commerce, Agricultural Chemicals & Pesticides, Antitrust, Appellate, Automotive Litigation & Autonomous Vehicles, Aviation, Banking & Finance, Bankruptcy, Business Taxation, Business Transactions, Cannabis, Class Action, Commercial Litigation, Community Association Law, Construction, Consumer Protection Litigation,  D&O and Shareholder Litigation, Domestic Relations, Drug & Medical Device, E-Discovery, Employment Law, Energy, Entertainment, Fashion, Media & Sports, Environmental & Toxic Tort, ERISA, Estate & Trust Litigation, Food & Beverage, Franchise Law, Government Regulatory & Administrative Law, Green Technology, Health Care, Insurance, Intellectual Property, International, Labor, Life Sciences, Life, Health & Disability, Maritime, Privacy, Data & Cybersecurity, Professional Liability Defense, Real Estate, Retail & Hospitality, Securities Litigation, Technology Litigation, Tort & Product Liability, Trials, Trucking & Transportation, Unfair Competition, Wealth Management, Probate & Asset Protection, and White Collar Criminal Defense.

Diversity 
Gordon & Rees has been recognized by the American Lawyer, Law360 and National Law Journal for its continued progress in increasing diversity in the legal profession. 

Gordon & Rees is ranked #43 on The American Lawyer'''s Diversity Scorecard  and #25 on The National Law Journal's'' Women in Law Scorecard. 

Since 2016, the firm has also earned a 100 on the Corporate Equality Index, national benchmarking survey and report on corporate policies and practices related to LGBT workplace equality, administered by the Human Rights Campaign Foundation.

Offices 
Gordon & Rees has offices in all 50 states: www.grsm.com/offices

References

External links
 Gordon & Rees website

Law firms established in 1974
Law firms based in San Francisco